Matthew Michel (born 29 March 1993) is a South African male badminton player.

Achievements

BWF International Challenge/Series
Men's Doubles

 BWF International Challenge tournament
 BWF International Series tournament
 BWF Future Series tournament

References

External links 
 

Living people
1993 births
South African male badminton players